|}

The Leopardstown 1,000 Guineas Trial Stakes is a Group 3 flat horse race in Ireland open to three-year-old thoroughbred fillies. It is run over a distance of 7 furlongs (1,408 metres) at Leopardstown in March or April.

History
The event used to be staged at Phoenix Park under the title 1,000 Guineas Trial. For a period it held Group 3 status. It was downgraded to Listed level in 1987.

The 1,000 Guineas Trial was transferred to Leopardstown in 1991. It regained Group 3 status in 2005.

The race can serve as a trial for various fillies' Classics in Europe. The last participant to win the Irish 1,000 Guineas was the 2022 winner, Homeless Songs. The last to achieve victory in the 1000 Guineas was Winter in 2017.

Records
Leading jockey since 1986 (6 wins):
 Michael Kinane – Claxton's Slew (1987), Welsh Muffin (1990), Idle Rich (1998), Amethyst (2000), Lahinch (2002), Arch Swing (2007)

Leading trainer since 1986 (11 wins):
 Aidan O'Brien – Classic Park (1997), Amethyst (2000), Lahinch (2002), Royal Tigress (2004), Virginia Waters (2005), Kamarinskaya (2006), Empowering (2011), Homecoming Queen (2012), Bracelet (2014), Hydrangea (2017), Love Locket (2020)

Winners since 1986

See also
 Horse racing in Ireland
 List of Irish flat horse races

References
 Racing Post:

 galopp-sieger.de – Leopardstown 1,000 Guineas Trial Stakes.
 horseracingintfed.com – International Federation of Horseracing Authorities – Race Detail (2019).
 pedigreequery.com – 1,000 Guineas Trial Stakes – Leopardstown.

Flat horse races for three-year-old fillies
Leopardstown Racecourse
Flat races in Ireland